Yale Boss (October 18, 1899 – November 16, 1977) was an American child actor of the silent screen.

Biography
New York-born Boss was one of the screen's first child stars. He was already a stage veteran when he made his screen debut in Thanhouser's The Actor's Children (1910). He appeared on Broadway opposite Adeline Genée in The Silver Star.

Later he became one of Edison Studios's most popular players, but the studio constantly had to battle rumors questioning his true age. Boss's popularity waned in the late 1910s and he later worked as a prop man.

By the time of his death at age 78, the former actor was operating a garage in Augusta, Georgia.

Partial filmography
The Actor's Children (1910)
Edna's Imprisonment (1911)
Dolly of the Dailies (1914)

Bibliography 
John Holmstrom, The Moving Picture Boy: An International Encyclopaedia from 1895 to 1995, Norwich, Michael Russell, 1996, pp. 14-15.

External links

 

1899 births
1977 deaths
American male child actors
American male silent film actors
American male stage actors
Male actors from Augusta, Georgia
People from Utica, New York
20th-century American male actors